The 2008 Petit Le Mans powered by the Totally New Mazda6 was the eleventh running of the Petit Le Mans and the tenth round of the 2008 American Le Mans Series season.  It took place at Road Atlanta in Braselton, Georgia, United States of America on October 4, 2008.  This race marked the first time that the American Le Mans Series awarded victors in their Green Challenge, in preparation for a full championship in the 2009 season.

Report

Qualifying
On Friday afternoon before Saturday's race, qualifying was held in two 25-minute sessions.  The two GT categories ran first, led by the lone GT1 entries of Corvette Racing.  Halfway through the session, it was Johnny O'Connell's #3 Corvette which achieved the fastest time before the squad ended the session early.  In GT2, much of the battle was between the various Porsche and Ferrari teams.  The Porsche of Farnbacher-Loles and the Ferrari of European entrant JMB Racing led early, but Jaime Melo in the Risi Competizione was able to give Ferrari the pole position by a margin of 0.057 seconds.  Marc Goossens' LG Motorsports Chevrolet Corvette was the fastest qualifier not in a Ferrari or Porsche, completing the session in seventh.

After a short break, the two Le Mans Prototype classes began their qualification session.  After six minutes, Allan McNish in the Audi R10 TDI claimed overall pole position.  Although Peugeot closed the gap on the Audi, McNish eventually returned to the pits to end his session.  As McNish exited the car, Stéphane Sarrazin was able to better the Audi's time by 0.085 seconds and claim overall pole position for the race.  In the LMP2 category, returning Penske Porsche driver Ryan Briscoe led the class early.  He was eventually joined by his two Penske teammates, giving the team a lock on the top three qualifying positions in the class.  Andretti Green Racing's Acura followed the Porsche trio.

Previous qualifying records for all four classes were broken in these two sessions. The top six overall qualifiers, the Peugeot, two Audis, and three Penske Porsches were also able to break an absolute track qualifying record initially set by Davy Jones in a Jaguar XJR-9 in 1992.

Qualifying result
Pole position winners in each class are marked in bold.

† - The #73 Tafel Racing was penalized due to a rule infraction during a pit stop in qualifying.  The car was therefore moved to the back of the starting grid.

Race
Just twenty minutes short of the ten-hour limit, the #1 Audi of Allan McNish completed the  endurance just 4.5 seconds ahead of the #07 Peugeot of Christian Klien.  The second Audi finished the overall podium, also on the lead lap.  In LMP2, rookie Petit Le Mans entrant Hélio Castroneves led the trio of Penske Porsches past the checkered flag, locking out the podium.  Porsches finished in five of the top six positions in the LMP2 class, joined only by the de Ferran Acura in fifth.

After earlier mechanical problems with the #4 Corvette, its #3 teammate led to victory in the GT1 class unchallenged.  The GT2 class was won by a Ferrari for the first time in the event's history, the #62 car of Risi Competizione leading the marque.  It was followed by several seconds by the championship-leading Flying Lizard Porsche.

In the first ever Green Challenge, Penske Racing and Corvette Racing won in their respective categories.  The #6 car was the most efficient of the LMP cars, while the already victorious #3 Corvette was also the most efficient amongst GTs.

Race result
Class winners in bold.  Cars failing to complete 70% of winner's distance marked as Not Classified (NC).

References

Petit Le Mans
Petit Le Mans
Petit Le Mans